Jeongjong of Joseon (26 July 1357 – 24 October 1419), born Yi Bang-gwa, whose changed name is Yi Gyeong, was the second ruler of the Joseon dynasty of Korea. He was the second son of King Taejo, the founder and first monarch of the dynasty. Before rising to power, he was known as Prince Yeongan (Korean: 영안군; Hanja: 永安君).

Biography
Born in 1357 as the second son of Yi Seong-gye and his first wife Lady Han, he was a prudent, generous, brave, and able military officer. During the latter days of the declining Goryeo dynasty, Jeongjong followed his father to various battlefronts and fought at his side. When his father became king in 1392, he became prince.

King Taejo had two wives—the first one, who gave birth to six sons including Jeongjong, died before Taejo was crowned. The second wife was Lady Gang, with whom he had two sons. The king favored his youngest son, whose mother was Lady Gang. Chief State Councillor Jeong Do-jeon also backed him as the successor to the throne, causing much disappointment for the other princes. In 1398, King Taejo's fifth son, Yi Bang-won, who later would become King Taejong, led a coup along with many military officers and killed his two younger half-brothers, Jeong Do-jeon, and many of his faction. Yi Bang-won first tried to show that he was not interested in taking the throne, so he gave a push to his older brother Yi Bang-gwa (who was also the oldest by then), to be the crown prince. King Taejo was upset and abdicated in disgust, and Jeongjong became the second king of Joseon. The same year he moved the capital back to Gaegyeong, the old Goryeo capital.

In 1400, a conflict broke out between Yi Bang-won and his older brother, Yi Bang-gan. Yi Bang-won's force attacked and defeated that of Bang-gan's, who was then sent into exile along with his family. General Park Bo, who persuaded Bang-gan into rebellion, was executed. King Jeongjong, knowing that he was a mere political figurehead for his younger brother Bang-won, appointed him as a crown prince, and abdicated months later.

He was an able, wise administrator even though his short reign was marked by bloodshed within the royal family. He banned all kinds of private troops on the advice of Crown Prince Bang-won. He died in 1419, and was buried alongside his wife, Queen Jeongan. The tomb is known as Huneung (후릉), and is located near Kaesong, in North Korea.

Family
Father: King Taejo of Joseon (조선 태조) (4 November 1335 – 27 June 1408)
Grandfather: Yi Ja-chun, King Hwanjo of Joseon (조선 환조 이자춘) (1315 – 1 January 1361)
Grandmother: Queen Uihye of the Yeongheung Choe clan (의혜왕후 최씨)
Mother: Queen Sinui of the Cheongju Han clan (신의왕후 한씨) (September 1337 – 21 October 1391)
Grandfather: Han Gyeong (한경)
Grandmother: Lady Shin of the Saknyeong Shin clan (삭녕 신씨)
Consorts and their respective issue(s):
 Queen Jeongan of the Gyeongju Gim clan (정안왕후 김씨) (22 January 1355 – 2 August 1412) — No issue.
 Royal Noble Consort Seong of the Chungju Ji clan (성빈 지씨)
 Yi Hu-saeng, Prince Deokcheon (덕천군 이후생) (1397 – 1465), tenth son
 Yi Mal-saeng, Prince Dopyeong (도평군 이말생) (1402 – ?), twelfth son
 Royal Consort Sug-ui of the Chungju Ji clan (숙의 지씨) (? – 1457)
 Yi Won-saeng, Prince Uipyeong (의평군 이원생) (? – 1461), first son
 Yi Mu-saeng, Prince Seonseong (선성군 이무생) (10 December 1396 – 7 July 1460), fourth son
 Yi Ho-saeng, Prince Imseong (임성군 이호생) (? – 1460), eleventh son
 Princess Hamyang (함양옹주), first daughter
 Royal Consort Sug-ui of the Haengju Gi clan (숙의 기씨) (? – 1457)
 Yi Gun-saeng, Prince Sunpyeong (순평군 이군생) (? – 1456), second son
 Yi Ui-saeng, Prince Geumpyeong (금평군 이의생) (? – 1435), third son
 Princess Sukshin (숙신옹주) (1401 – ?), second daughter
 Princess Deokcheon (덕천옹주), third daughter
 Princess Goseong (고성옹주), fourth daughter
 Yi Yung-saeng, Prince Jeongseok (정석군 이융생) (1409 – 1464),  fourteenth son
 Yi Seon-saeng, Prince Murim (무림군 이선생) (1410 – 1475), fifteenth son
 Princess Sangwon (상원옹주), fifth daughter
 Princess Jeonsan (전산옹주), sixth daughter
 Royal Consort Sug-ui of the Nampyeong Mun clan (숙의 문씨)
 Yi Gwi-saeng, Prince Jongui (종의군 이귀생) (1393 – 1451), fifth son
 Royal Consort Sug-ui of the Pyeongchang Yi clan (숙의 이씨) (? – 1443)
 Yi Jong-saeng, Prince Jinnam (진남군 이종생) (1406 – 1470), sixth son
 Royal Consort Sug-ui of the Haepyeong Yun clan (숙의 윤씨) (1368 – 1417)
 Yi Deok-saeng, Prince Sudo (수도군 이덕생) (? – 1449), seventh son
 Yi Nok-saeng, Prince Imeon (임언군 이녹생) (1399 – 1450), eighth son 
 Yi Bok-saeng, Prince Seokbo (석보군 이복생) (? – 1447), ninth son
 Yi Bo-saeng, Prince Jangcheon (장천군 이보생), thirteenth son
 Princess Incheon (인천옹주) (1401 – ?), seventh daughter
 Princess Haman (함안옹주), eighth daughter
 Royal Lady Gaui of the Yu clan (가의궁주 유씨)
 Yi Bul-no (이불노) (1388 – 1410) — Unacknowledged son.
 Cho Gung-jang (초궁장)
 Gi-mae (기매)
 Yi Ji-un (이지운) (? – 1424) — Unacknowledged son.

Ancestry

In popular culture
 Portrayed by Nam Seong-sik in the 1983 KBS TV series Foundation of the Kingdom.
Portrayed by Lee Young-ho in the 1983 MBC TV series The King of Chudong Palace.
Portrayed by Tae Min-young in the 1996–1998 KBS TV series Tears of the Dragon.
Portrayed by No Young-gook in the 2008 KBS TV series The Great King, Sejong.
Portrayed by Oh Hee-joon in the 2012–2013 SBS TV series The Great Seer.
 Portrayed by Lee Tae-rim in the 2014 KBS1 TV series Jeong Do-jeon.
 Portrayed by Seo Dong-won in the 2015–2016 SBS TV series Six Flying Dragons.
 Portrayed by Kim Myung-soo in the 2021 KBS1 TV series The King of Tears, Lee Bang-won.

See also
 List of monarchs of Korea

Notes

1357 births
1419 deaths
14th-century Korean monarchs
15th-century Korean monarchs
People from Hamhung